Beverly Harrison may refer to:

 Beverly Wildung Harrison (1932–2012), American feminist theologian
 Bev Harrison (Beverly John Harrison, born 1942), teacher and New Brunswick politician